Agnes Pardaens (born 9 October 1956) is a Belgian long-distance runner. She competed in the women's marathon at the 1988 Summer Olympics.

References

1956 births
Living people
Athletes (track and field) at the 1988 Summer Olympics
Belgian female long-distance runners
Belgian female marathon runners
Olympic athletes of Belgium
Place of birth missing (living people)